Golborne Bellow is a former civil parish, now in the parish of Tattenhall and District, in Cheshire West and Chester, England.  It contains three buildings that are recorded in the National Heritage List for England as designated listed buildings, all of which are at Grade II.  This grade is the lowest of the three gradings given to listed buildings and is applied to "buildings of national importance and special interest".  Other than part of the village of Gatesheath, the parish is entirely rural.  The listed buildings consist of two farmhouses, and a set of farm buildings.

See also
Listed buildings in Beeston
Listed buildings in Broxton
Listed buildings in Burwardsley
Listed buildings in Chowley
Listed buildings in Golborne David
Listed buildings in Handley
Listed buildings in Hargrave
Listed buildings in Huxley
Listed buildings in Tattenhall

References

Listed buildings in Cheshire West and Chester
Lists of listed buildings in Cheshire